South End Rowing Club is an athletic club and social club in San Francisco, California.

The South End Rowing Club, founded in 1873, is one of the oldest athletics clubs in the western United States. The boathouse, with a fleet of 30 boats, is located in San Francisco, California, at 500 Jefferson Street near Fisherman's Wharf, adjacent to the San Francisco Aquatic Park. The club supports participation in rowing, swimming, handball, and running.

History

The original boathouse was located in the South End neighborhood (subsequently torn down), near present-day AT&T Park and Mission Bay. The boathouse was moved by barge to Aquatic Park in the early 1900s, and to its present location in 1938. Portions of the original boathouse remain a part of the club.

The South End Rowing Club maintains a fierce but friendly rivalry with its next-door neighbor, the Dolphin Club. The clubs hold an annual triathlon in rowing, swimming, and running. As of 2010, the South End Rowing Club has won the competition 29 of the past 31 years. The ladies' crew from the South End races its wooden barge against the ladies' crew from the Dolphin Club.

Every year since 1978 the South End Rowing Club has hosted the Bridge to Bridge Regatta in September. This race is open to the public, and typically includes singles and doubles, and plastic and wooden boats alike. The race courses vary from year to year, but there is typically a  "long course" which starts at Aquatic Park and circumnavigates the south tower of the Golden Gate Bridge and the westernmost tower San Francisco–Oakland Bay Bridge, as well as a "short course" from Aquatic Park around the Bay Bridge tower and back.

The South End also hosts a yearly competitive swim from Alcatraz Island in San Francisco bay to the Aquatic Park, which is open to the public. The event is limited to 600 swimmers and reaches its capacity for registration months in advance.

See also
 Dolphin South End Runners
 Walt Stack, founder Dolphin South End Runners
 Dolphin Club (San Francisco), neighboring rowing club
 Irish Hill (San Francisco)

References 

 Club Rowing on San Francisco Bay, 1869-1939, Featuring the South End Rowing Club
 The South End Rowing Club - HISTORIC RESOURCE EVALUATION - Carey & Co., Inc. (archive)

External links
 

Multi-sport clubs in the United States
Rowing clubs in the United States
Sports clubs established in 1873
Sports teams in San Francisco
Sports in San Francisco